Miligram is a Serbian pop band. The band is named after the founder and member Aleksandar Milić. Miligram's latest album Magnetic was released on 12 December 2015.

They have their record label, Miligram Music.

Tours
In order to promote their third album Ludi petak, Miligram embarked on a tour with the first concert being held in the Mejdan arena in Tuzla, Bosnia and Herzegovina on 12 April 2014. They held a concert in Belgrade's Kombank Arena on 29 November 2014.

Alen Ademović, frontman of the band, initially gained acclaim as a member of Goran Bregović's Weddings and Funerals Orchestra. He plays 12 musical instruments.

Members
Aleksandar Milić Mili: guitar
Adi Šoše: vocal
Marko Prodanović (Dee Marcus): DJ
Arion Petrovski: drums
Danilo Orbović: electric guitar

Past members
Alen Ademović: vocal
Slobodan Vasić: bass guitar
Mića Kovačević: drums
Srećko Mitrović: keyboard
Neša Bojković: guitar

Discography

Studio albums
Miligram (2009, re-released 2010)
Miligram 2 (2012)
Ludi petak (2013)
Miligram Magnetic (2015)
Miligram Hit Trip (2018–19)

Studio albums, Ceca & Miligram Music
Fatalna ljubav (1995)
Emotivna luda (1996)
Maskarada (1997)
Ceca 2000 (1999)
Decenija (2001)
Gore od ljubavi (2004)
Idealno loša (2006)
Ljubav živi (2011)
Poziv (2013)
Autogram (2016)

Compilation albums
The Best Of Miligram (2013)
Pop Mix (2014)

Singles
Bulevari (2014)
Ja sto posto (2016)
Plaćam parama (2019)
Karotida (2019)

References

Serbian pop-folk music groups
Musical groups established in 2009